Tuoba Shiyijian (320–376) was the last prince of the Xianbei-led Dai dynasty of China and ruled from 338 to 376 when Dai was conquered by the Former Qin dynasty. He was the son of Tuoba Yulü and the younger brother of Tuoba Yihuai, whom he succeeded in 338. In 340 he moved the capital to Shengle (盛樂) (near modern Horinger County, Inner Mongolia). His grandson Tuoba Gui later founded the Northern Wei dynasty and accorded him the posthumous name Emperor Zhaocheng (昭成皇帝) and the temple name Gaozu (高祖).

Personal information 
Consort and issue(s):
Princess, of the Murong clan (慕容氏), sister of Murong Huang
Lady, of the Murong clan (慕容氏), relative of Murong Huang
Empress Zhaocheng, of the Murong clan (昭成皇后慕容氏, d. 360), daughter of Murong Huang
Tuoba Shi, Emperor Xianming (獻明皇帝 拓跋寔, d. 371), second son
Tuoba Han (明秦王 拓跋翰), third son
Tuoba Yanpo (拓跋阏婆, d. 376), fourth son
Tuoba Shoujiu (拓跋壽鳩), eight son
Unknowm
Tuoba Shijun (拓跋寔君, d. 376), first son
Tuoba Gegen, Prince Huan of  Qinghe (清河桓王 拓跋紇根), fifth son
Tuoba Digan (拓跋地干), sixth son
Tuoba Lizhen, Prince Cheng of Peng  (彭城王 拓跋力真), seventh son
Tuoba Quduo (拓跋屈咄), ninth son
Princess of  Liaoxi (辽西公主), first daughter
Married He Yegan maternal nephew of Shiyijian and the Helan chieftain
Princess Tuoba (拓跋氏), second daughter
Married Liu Wuhuan 
Princess Tuoba (拓跋氏) third daughter
Princess Tuoba (拓跋氏), fourth daughter

References 

 History of the Northern Dynasties

4th-century Chinese monarchs
4th-century murdered monarchs
320 births
376 deaths
Princes of Dai (Sixteen Kingdoms)